Bryopastoridae is a family of bryozoans belonging to the order Cheilostomatida.

Genera:
 Bryopastor Gordon, 1982
 Cladobryopastor Gordon & Taylor, 2015
 Dioptropora Marsson, 1887
 Monticellaria Voigt, 1987
 Omoiosia Canu & Bassler, 1927
 Pseudothyracella Labracherie, 1975
 Thyracella Voigt, 1930
 Virgocella Voigt, 1957

References

Bryozoan families